The 2022 Women's EuroHockey Indoor Championship was the 21st edition of the Women's EuroHockey Indoor Championship, the biennial international women's indoor hockey championship of Europe organized by the European Hockey Federation.

It was originally planned to be held alongside the men's tournament from 12 to 16 January 2022 at the Alsterdorfer Sporthalle in Hamburg, Germany. However on 22 December 2021, the tournament was postponed to 7 to 11 December 2022 due to the COVID-19 pandemic in Europe.

Qualified teams
Participating nations have qualified based on their final ranking from the 2020 competition.

Results

Preliminary round

Fifth place game

Third place game

Final

Statistics

Final standings

Goalscorers

See also
2022 Men's EuroHockey Indoor Championship
2022 Women's EuroHockey Indoor Championship II

Notes

References

Women's EuroHockey Indoor Championship
women 1
International women's indoor hockey competitions hosted by Germany
EuroHockey Indoor Championship
EuroHockey Indoor Championship
EuroHockey Indoor Championship
Sports competitions in Hamburg
2020s in Hamburg
EuroHockey Indoor Championship